Gulay Fərzəliyeva 

Gulay language
Zeki Gülay

See also
Gulay-gorod